Rihkhawdar (also called Rih), next to Khawmawi, is a border town in Falam District, Chin State, Myanmar. It lies opposite Zokhawthar village of the Champhai district of Mizoram, India, across the Tiau (Ciau) river. The town is home to an official border trade post with India, which opened on 10 December 2003.

India-Myanmar border 
Rikhawdar and Khawmawi form the east side of an India-Myanmar border crossing, which consists of two bridges - one pedestrian, and one vehicular - across the Harhva river. It is one of the two international border crossings in the Chin State.

See also 

 Borders of India

References 

India–Myanmar border crossings
 Populated places in Chin State